Mortimer Spiegelman (December 10, 1901 – March 25, 1969) was an American statistician, actuary, and demographer whose research focused on the application of statistics to the field of public health. He was Staff Statistician at the American Public Health Association (APHA) from 1967 until his death in 1969. He was a fellow of the APHA, the Society of Actuaries, and the American Statistical Association. The APHA's Statistics Section has awarded the Mortimer Spiegelman Award in his honor since 1970. The annual award is given to a distinguished public health statistician under the age of 40.

References

1901 births
1969 deaths
American statisticians
American demographers
People in public health
Scientists from New York City
People from Brooklyn
New York University alumni
Harvard University alumni
Fellows of the American Statistical Association
American actuaries
Biostatisticians
Mathematicians from New York (state)